Hippolytus of Thebes was a Byzantine author of the late 7th or early 8th century. His Chronicle, preserved only in part, is an especially valuable source for New Testament chronology.

Preserved fragments are scattered in about 40 manuscripts, mostly dealing with the Holy Family.
Thus, according to the Chronicle, Jesus was crucified in AD 30, and   Mary, mother of Jesus lived for eleven years longer, dying in AD 41.

The Chronicle is cited twice in the "short chronological notes" compiled under Constantine V (r. 741–775).
Epiphanius the Monk, writing in the early 9th century, names Hippolytus as one of his authorities on the Life of the Blessed Virgin. Another fragment reports that after the Ascension, Mary continued to live in Jerusalem in a house bought by John the Apostle with the inheritance from his father Zebedee. This tradition of a house of Mary in Jerusalem is first alluded to by Sophronius of Jerusalem (d. 638). Based on such evidence, the floruit of Hippolytus is placed roughly between AD 650 and 750.

The first edition of  extant portions of the Chronicle was published  by Emmanuel Schelstrate  in 1692. The text was again edited by Migne in Patrologia Graeca (PG 117, col. 1025–1056). A critical edition was published by Diekamp (1898).

References

7th-century Byzantine historians
8th-century Byzantine historians
Byzantine chroniclers